Hertha Kluge-Pott is a German-born Australian printmaker based in Melbourne.

Early life and education 
Kluge-Pott was born in Berlin in 1934 into an upper-middle-class German family and studied at the Hochschule für Bildende Künste and Braunschweig from 1953 to 1958, where she knew Gunter Grass who was studying graphics and was the student representative.

Australia 
Against her family's wishes Kluge-Pott migrated from Hamburg to Australia in 1958, aged 23, having graduated and after the death of her father. The ship on which she was traveling, the Skaubryn, caught fire on 1 April 1958,  three days out of Colombo on the way to Perth, and passengers evacuated in life boats, watching as it burned, and in her case, with all her possessions. A cargo ship transferred them to another before their arrival on a Dutch vessel, which sank some time later. Recounting the adventure in a 1988 interview, Kluge-Pott recalled;  "I arrived in Australia in a trance. I was 23, I had no money and no belongings. It took me a long time to find my identity in Australia."

Settling in Melbourne, she studied at RMIT from 1960 to 1963 where her work in intaglio and other techniques was recognised, with two etchings included in the important early national touring exhibition 'Australian print survey', organised by the Art Gallery of New South Wales in 1963.

Style 
Of Australia Kluge-Pott has said: "I think there is no other country like this. Words are too flat to describe it. It is frightening, threatening, beautiful [ ... ] I have been here for 30 years, and I know the work I do could not have been done anywhere else in the world but Terra Australis." Her favoured technique is intaglio, with added textural qualities in drypoint.

Reception 
Writing in 1997 of Kluge-Pott's second solo exhibition at Australian Galleries in Melbourne, Jenny Zimmer writes; Awesome is the word that best describes Hertha Kluge-Pott's recent etchings. Dark, brooding and passionate as ever, they echo oceanic moods and reverberate with the sparse coastal vegetation's harsh struggle with the elements around Cape Bridgewater and west into South Australia's sandy wind-swept Coorong. The artist, a born naturalist, enjoys a symbiotic relationship with sea and coast a union begun dramatically 40 years ago when the ship Skaubryn, on which she set out for Australia, went down in the Bay of Bengal. The prints, etchings and dry points are made with traditional methods learnt at the Berlin Academy. They can be read in numerous ways. Pages of a Survey is a series of eight small drypoints scratched directly on to the plates, probably while on field excursions. Recorded are tangled ti trees and other coastal plants grown dense and gnarled for protection against the ravages of nature. She interprets them as growing inward into complicated bundles of matter, their sturdy outline shapes darkened by detail that grows thicker and richer at each epicentre. Then she extracts a leaf, a pod, a flower or some other distinctive element and, placing it to one side, renders it precisely as if studied under a looking glass. Robert Nelson, though recognising her skilfulness, less understands what is relayed;Imagery of Hertha Kluge-Pott is promising, teeming with vibrant life-forms and detail. Yet ... the earnest decoction of nature in mannered arrangements doesn't succeed in communicating much about the subject matter.

Career 
After traveling during 1964–65 to Spain, Italy and Germany, Kluge-Pott continued a career in printmaking, as well as teaching the medium. She established a printmaking workshop at the Melbourne State College in printmaking and drawing 1968–78, with breaks to practice and study overseas at Hamburg Academy of Art and to travel in Italy and the United Kingdom 1974–75,  and then lectured at RMIT 1979–92, where in 1985 she was made senior lecturer. She returned to RMIT to teach part-time 1993-4 and in 1995 at the Victorian College of the Arts, also part-time.

She held seven solo exhibitions 1972–90 in Melbourne including at Stuart Gerstman and Powell St galleries, in Brisbane, Canberra and Geelong.

Alongside Graham King, Tate Adams and Udo Sellbach, Kluge-Pott was an early and significant member of the Print Council of Australia and she participated in their touring exhibitions and other group exhibitions including award exhibitions at Fremantle 1985–91; MPAC Spring Festival 1984, 86, 88, 90; Henri Worland, Warrnambool 1981, 87, 90, 91, 92.

She was the 1996 Judge for the Silk Cut Acquisitive Award, Melbourne and in 2003 was appointed patron at the establishment of ‘Portland Bay Press’ print workshop & studio.

Exhibitions

Solo 
 2018 ‘Recent work’, Australian Galleries, Melbourne 
 2015 Australian Galleries, Derby Street, Melbourne 
 2010 ‘Recent work’, Australian Galleries, Melbourne 
 2005 Australian Galleries Works on Paper, Melbourne 
 2005 Grahame Galleries + Editions, Brisbane 
 2001 Australian Galleries Works on Paper, Sydney
 1997 Australian Galleries, Melbourne 
 1994 Australian Galleries, Melbourne
 1993 Grahame Galleries + Editions, Brisbane 
 1990 Powell Street Graphics Gallery, Melbourne 
 1987 Powell Street Graphics Gallery, Melbourne 
 1985 Works Gallery, Geelong, VIC 
 1982 Stuart Gerstman Gallery, Melbourne 
 1981 Studio One Print Workshop & Gallery, Brisbane 
 1978 Susan Gillespie Gallery, Canberra 
 1972 Vic Langsam Galleries Melbourne

Group 

 2019 ‘papermade’, Australian Galleries, Melbourne ‘Imprint: A Survey of the Print Council of Australia’, Parliament House Gallery, Parliament House of Australia, Canberra 
 ‘Art Meets Nature’, presented by WAMA, The Atrium, Sofitel, Melbourne 
 ‘Melbourne Modern: European art & design at RMIT since 1945’, RMIT Gallery, Melbourne 26 June 2019 
 2018 ‘Native Flora’, Silver Leaf Art Box, Merricks, VIC 
 2016 ‘Impressions’, Australian Print Workshop, Melbourne 
 2014 ‘International Print Exhibition, Australia and Japan’, Kyoto Municipal Museum of Art, Kyoto, Japan; Fukuyama Museum of Art, Hiroshima, Japan 
 ‘one of each’, Australian Galleries, Derby Street, Melbourne 
 2012-13 ‘Works from the Stock Rooms’, Australian Galleries, Smith Street, Melbourne 
 2011 ‘large exhibition of small works’, Australian Galleries, Roylston Street, Sydney 
 ‘large exhibition of small works’, Australian Galleries, Derby Street, Melbourne 
 ‘Nature of the Mark’, Australian Galleries, Smith Street, Melbourne 
 2010 ‘Summer stock show’, Australian Galleries, Smith Street, Melbourne 
 ‘Artists’ Prints made with Integrity I’, Australian Galleries, Smith Street, Melbourne 
 2009-10 ‘Summer Stock Show’, Australian Galleries, Smith Street, Melbourne 
 2009 ‘Stock show’, Australian Galleries, Glenmore Road, Sydney 
 ‘Artists’ ink: printmaking from the Warrnambool Art Gallery Collection, 1970-2001’, Ararat Regional Art Gallery, Ararat, VIC 
 2008 ‘Summer Stock Show’, Australian Galleries Smith Street, Melbourne 
 ‘Male Formy Grafici’ Lodz, Poland 
 2007 ‘Artists Ink’ Warrnambool Art Gallery Collections 1970 -2001, Warrnambool, VIC 
 2006 ‘Marks and Motives: Prints from the PCA Collection QUT Art Museum, Brisbane 
 ‘Summer Stock Show’, Australian Galleries Works on Paper, Melbourne 
 ‘Bookish’, Australian Galleries Works on Paper, Melbourne 
 ‘50th Anniversary Exhibition’, 5 June, Australian Galleries, Melbourne 
 2005 ‘Contemporary Works on Paper’, Australian Galleries Works on Paper, Melbourne 
 ‘Notes from the Natural World’, Australian Galleries, Melbourne 
 2004 ‘Surface Tension’, Twenty one contemporary Australian printmakers, New York Society of Etchers inc, New York, NY, USA; Gallery 101, Melbourne & Academy Gallery, University of Tasmania, Launceston, TAS 
 ‘Contemporary Australian Prints’ from the collection, Art Gallery of NSW, Sydney 
 ‘Situate’, Prints from the collection, Warrnambool Art Gallery, Warrnambool, VIC 
 ‘Artists’ Books and So…’, Grahame Galleries & Editions, Brisbane 
 ‘Panorama’, Australian Galleries, Melbourne 
 ‘Species’, Australian Galleries, Melbourne 
 2002 ‘Landscapes’, Australian Galleries, Sydney 
 ‘Wild Nature in Contemporary Australian Art and Craft’, Jam Factory, Adelaide 
 2001 ‘Workings of the mind; Melbourne Prints 1960’s-1990’s, Heidi Museum of Modern Art, Melbourne 
 ‘Landscape and Environment’, Australian Galleries, Melbourne 
 ‘Contemporary Works on Paper’, Australian Galleries, Sydney 
 2000 ‘Australian Identities in Printmaking’, Wagga Wagga Regional Art Gallery, Wagga Wagga, NSW 
 ‘Workings of the Mind; Melbourne Prints 1960s – 1990s’, Queensland University of Technology Art Museum, Brisbane 
 ‘Prints, Drawings & Watercolours’, Australian Galleries, Melbourne 
 1999 ‘Rena Ellen Jones Memorial Print Award’, Warrnambool Art Gallery, Warrnambool, VIC 
 ‘Australian Paper Awards’, George Adams Gallery, Victorian Arts Centre, Melbourne
 ‘Australian Paper Awards’, Drill Hall Gallery, Canberra 
 ‘Australian Paper Awards’, University of Technology, Ultimo, Sydney 
 1998-99 ‘Look Again: Contemporary prints and drawings from the collection’, National Gallery of Victoria, Melbourne 
 1998 ‘Australian Prints from the Collection’, Art Gallery of NSW, Sydney 
 ‘Fremantle Print Award Exhibition’, Fremantle, WA 26 June 2019 
 ‘Decalogue’, Catalogue of 10 years of Australian Printmaking, Metropolitan Museum of Seoul, Korea 
 ‘The Big Small Print Show’, Grahame Galleries & Editions, Brisbane 
 1997 ‘I Had a Dream’, National Gallery of Victoria, Melbourne 
 ‘Warrnambool Print Award’, Warrnambool Art Gallery, Warrnambool, VIC 
 ‘Australian Printmedia Award Exhibition’, University of Western Sydney, Macarthur, NSW 
 ‘Geelong Acquisitive Print Prize Exhibition’, Geelong, VIC 
 ‘Relationships’, Works on Paper, Irene Amos Collection, Toowoomba Regional Art Gallery, 
 Toowoomba, QLD 
 1996 ‘Male Formy Grafica’, Lodz, Poland 
 ‘UWS Macarthur National Printmedia Acquisitive Exhibition’, Casula Powerhouse Arts Centre, Sydney 
 ‘People, Prints & Patronage’, 1900-1996 Print Collection of Geelong Art Gallery, Geelong, VIC 
 1995 ‘Contemporary Printmakers from Australian Galleries’, LaTrobe Regional Gallery, Morwell, VIC 
 ‘Sites & Places: A Survey exhibition with Danny McDonald’, touring Victorian & South Australian Regional Galleries, organised by Riddoch Art Gallery 
 ‘Recent Prints’, Australian Galleries, Melbourne 
 ‘Eveolution’, Newcastle Regional Art Gallery, Newcastle, NSW 
 1994 ‘Artists Book Fair’, State Library of Queensland, Brisbane 
 1993 ‘City of Richmond Acquisitive Award Exhibition’, Melbourne 
 1992 ‘Henri Worland Acquisitive Award Survey Exhibition’, Warrnambool Art Gallery, Warrnambool, VIC 
 ‘Transitional Times Plus’, Print Council of Australia & Faculty of Art & Design, RMIT, Melbourne 
 1991 ‘IV Biennale Small Graphic Forms’, Ostrow, Poland 
 ‘Students Choice’, Survey Exhibition, Wagga Wagga Art Gallery, Wagga Wagga, NSW 
 1990-91 ‘Henri Worland Print Award Exhibition’, Warrnambool Art Gallery, Warrnambool, VIC 
 ‘Acquisitive Award Exhibitions’, M.L.C, Melbourne 
 1990 ‘A New Image, Prints’, Powell Street Graphics, Melbourne 
 1989-91 ‘Small Graphic Forms’, Lodz, Poland 
 1988 ‘With the Imprint of Another Culture’, Print Council of Australia, Melbourne, touring exhibition
 1987 ‘Yarra Valley High School’, Print Award Exhibition, VIC 
 ‘Henri Worland Print Award Exhibition’, Warrnambool Art Gallery, Warrnambool, VIC 
 1985-93 ‘Fremantle Print Award Exhibition’, Fremantle, WA 
 1985 ‘Australian prints ’85’, Print Council of Australia Exhibition to the University of Oregon, Memphis Brooks Museum of Art, USA 
 1984-96 ‘Print Biennial’, Mornington Peninsula Regional Gallery, Mornington, VIC 
 1984 ‘Selected mini prints’, Print Council of Australia, Melbourne, Travelling Exhibition, Australian State Galleries, Japan AICHI Cultural Centre, OGISU Memorial Museum, Toyohashi City Museum 
 1983 Stuart Gerstman Galleries, Melbourne 
 ‘Diamond Valley Art Award Exhibition’, Diamond Valley, VIC 
 1982 ‘12 Australian Printmakers’, Oxford, UK 
 Darmstadt-Hessisches Landes Museum, Bayreuth Erlangen University, Germany 
 1978 ‘Australian Etching’, Print Council of Australia, Melbourne 
 National Gallery of Victoria, Melbourne & Main State Galleries 
 1972-76 ‘International Print Biennale’, Krakow, Poland 
 1972 ‘Images’, Australian Department of Foreign Affairs, India 
 1963, Prints '63, Studio One Printmakers, Tate Adams, Barbara Brash, Janet Dawson, Grahame King, Hertha Kluge-Pott, Jan Senbergs, Fred Willliams
 1963-64 ‘Australian Print Survey’, Print Council of Australia, Melbourne, Travelling Exhibition

Awards 

 1966: F.E. Richardson Print Prize, Geelong Gallery
 1987, 1889, 1991: Henri Worland acquisitive prize, Warrnambool Art Gallery
 1982, 1984, 1988. MPAC acquisitive
1990 MLC Acquisitive Art Award, Melbourne 
1996 Daily Telegraph Mirror Acquisitive Award, University of Western Sydney, Macarthur, NSW 
1999 Australian Paper Art Award, Melbourne

Collections 

 National Gallery of Australia
 Art Gallery of New South Wales
 Art Gallery of South Australia
 National Gallery of Victoria
 Queensland Art Gallery
 Geelong Gallery
 Newcastle Regional Art Gallery
 BHP corporate collection
 Ostrow City Museum, Poland
Queensland University of Technology, Brisbane
 Queensland State Library - James Hardy Collection, Brisbane 
 Hamilton Art Gallery, Hamilton, VIC 
 Ipswich City Art Gallery, Ipswich, NSW 
 Mornington Peninsula Art Centre, Mornington, VIC 
 Riddoch Art Gallery, Adelaide 
 University of Western Sydney, Macarthur Collection, NSW 
 Wagga Wagga City Art Gallery, Wagga Wagga, NSW 
 Warrnambool Art Gallery, Warrnambool, VIC 
 University of Melbourne, Melbourne 
 Royal Melbourne Institute of Technology, Melbourne 
 Toowoomba Regional Art Gallery, NSW 
 City Art Gallery, Newcastle, NSW 
 City of Banyule, Melbourne 
 Australian Paper Corporate Art Collection, Australia 
 Artbank, Sydney 
 Centre for the Artist Book Collection, Grahame Galleries & Editions, Brisbane 
 City of Whitehorse, Melbourne 
 Deakin University, Melbourne 
 Education Department of Victoria, Melbourne 
 Geelong Grammar School
 Yarra Valley School Gallery
 Methodist Ladies College, Melbourne 
 Lodz, Poland: Male Formy Grafici 
 Print Council of Australia, Melbourne
 Monash University Collection, Melbourne 
 Australian Embassy, Singapore 
 Department of Foreign Affairs, Canberra

References 

Australian women artists
German emigrants to Australia
Australian printmakers
1934 births
Living people